Nathaniel De La Rosa (born March 17, 1985), known professionally as Bodega Bamz, is of Dominican/Puerto Rican decent rapper/actor from Spanish Harlem, New York. De La Rosa first attracted attention for his 2012 mixtape, Strictly 4 My P.A.P.I.Z, which featured ASAP Ferg, Joell Ortiz, A$ton Matthews, Tego Calderon and Flatbush Zombies. De La Rosa later collaborated with the Martinez Brothers and released an EP, Sunday Service (2014). In 2015, he released his debut album, Sidewalk Exec. In 2017, he was cast in the Showtime series SMILF.

Career 
The 2012 critically acclaimed mixtape release of Strictly 4 My P.A.P.I.Z, showcased Bodega Bamz artistry and solidified his place in the hip-hop community. Strictly 4 My P.A.P.I.Z. includes features from ASAP Ferg, Joell Ortiz, A$ton Matthews, and Flatbush Zombies. Bodega Bamz teamed up with The Martinez Brothers and released an EP, Sunday Service (2014). In 2015, Bodega Bamz released his debut album Sidewalk Exec. Bodega Bamz also showcased another one of his talents by making his acting debut in his own cult film The Streets Owe Me, Hell Train and most recently cast in the Showtime series, SMILF. As of March 2020, he had a guest-starring role on the second season FBI.

Discography

Studio albums 
 Sidewalk Exec (2015)
 PAPI (2018)
 Yamz Heard This (2020)

Mixtapes 
The Rest is Noise (2009)
Loosies & Brewskies (2011)
 Strictly 4 My P.A.P.I.Z. (2012)
 Sunday Service (with The Martinez Brothers) (2014)
 Menace Tan Society (with Tanboys) (2015)
 All Eyez Off Me (2016)
 Westside Highway Story (with Joell Ortiz and Nitty Scott as No Panty, prod. by Salaam Remi) (2016)
 Bodega's Way (2019)

Guest appearances

Filmography

Television

References 

Living people
People from East Harlem
East Coast hip hop musicians
Rappers from Manhattan
American musicians of Puerto Rican descent
American rappers of Dominican Republic descent
Hispanic and Latino American rappers
1985 births
21st-century American rappers